Willis Russell Cole (January 6, 1882 – October 11, 1965) was an outfielder in Major League Baseball. He played for the Chicago White Sox.

References

External links

1882 births
1965 deaths
People from Milton, Wisconsin
Sportspeople from Madison, Wisconsin
Major League Baseball outfielders
Chicago White Sox players
Baseball players from Wisconsin
Erie Fishermen players
Erie Sailors players
Wichita Jobbers players
Lincoln Railsplitters players
Indianapolis Indians players
Denver Bears players